Georgia competed at the 2016 Winter Youth Olympics in Lillehammer, Norway from 12 to 21 February 2016.

Alpine skiing

Boys

Luge

See also
Georgia at the 2016 Summer Olympics

References

2016 in Georgian sport
Nations at the 2016 Winter Youth Olympics
Georgia (country) at the Youth Olympics